David Jukl (born 2 January 1991) is a professional Czech football player currently playing for FC Zbrojovka Brno.

References
 Profile at iDNES.cz
 Profile at FC Zbrojovka Brno official site

Czech footballers
1991 births
Living people
Czech First League players
FC Zbrojovka Brno players
Association football midfielders
People from Nové Město na Moravě
Sportspeople from the Vysočina Region